Luton, England, is a unitary authority, and remains part of the ceremonial county of Bedfordshire. Luton is currently represented on three different tiers of Government.

 Luton Borough Council - 48 councillors (local)
 Bedfordshire Police and Crime Commissioner
 Parliament of the United Kingdom - 2 members of parliament (national)

Formerly the East of England Regional Assembly (regional).

History 
Prior to the Local Government Act 1972, Luton had been a county borough, but still part of the county of Bedfordshire. However, with the abolition of the county boroughs, Luton was fully integrated into Bedfordshire and its county council. This wasn't to last however, as in 1992, the Local Government Commission for England, recommended that Luton be made into a unitary authority and be separate of the county council. The government agreed and this was enforced from 1997 onwards.

Luton remains part of Bedfordshire for ceremonial purposes and one Lord Lieutenant serves for the whole ceremonial county.

Luton Borough Council 

The council is split and represented by 19 wards, with a total of 48 councillors. Following the 2019 Local election, 32 are Labour, 12 councillors are Liberal Democrats and 4 are Conservative.

The council offices are centred on the Town Hall on George Street, Luton.

Local election results 

NB: The make up of the council changed between 2003 and 2007, hence the apparent inconsistencies between the councillors in 2003 and the changes recorded for 2007.

East of England Regional Assembly 

Whilst not a directly elected body, the East of England Regional Assembly is responsible for promoting the economic, environmental and social well-being of the East England region. It is made up of representatives from councils across the region, business organisations, public sector agencies, education and training bodies, trade unions and co-operatives and the voluntary and community sector.

Police and Crime Commissioner 
The Police and Crime Commissioner is a Bedfordshire county wide post and is held for the Conservative Party by Festus Akinbusoye.

UK Parliament 

In Luton, there are two constituencies, Luton North and Luton South. The current two members of parliament (MP) are Sarah Owen (Luton North – Labour) and Rachel Hopkins (Luton South – Labour).

From 1979 the MPs from Luton were Conservative, however in the 1997 General Election, both constituencies were won by the Labour party candidates, these were successfully held at the 2001, 2005 and 2010 general elections.

The town of Luton had until 1885 been part of the Bedfordshire constituency which was created in 1290. Upon the abolition of this seat the constituency of Luton was created which remained the only seat in the town until 1974.

In 1974 the single Luton seat was divided into two, Luton West and Luton East. These two seats were fairly short lived and in 1983 the current Luton North and Luton South seats were created.

Over the years Luton has been represented by various political parties, and as can be seen below has often mirrored the Government of the day.

Members of Parliament for Luton constituency

Luton East 
 Constituency created (1974)

Constituency abolished (1983)

Luton West 
 Constituency created (1974)

Constituency abolished (1983)

Luton North 
Constituency created (1983)

Luton South 
Constituency created (1983)

References 

Luton